Schmidtsche Schack - ARVOS is a German enterprise with headquarters and fabrication facilities in Kassel. The company also operates a branch office in Düsseldorf and has affiliated units in the US, Japan and Singapore.

It has its roots in Schmidt’sche Heissdampf-Gesellschaft mbH founded by Wilhelm Schmidt in 1910. The firm belongs to ARVOS Group and is a world leader in process gas cooling systems for the chemical, petrochemical and metallurgical industries. In fiscal year 2018, the sales figure amounted to approx. EURO 335 million.

History

Company history in the 19th century 

As early as in 1880, long before the company Schmidt’sche Heissdampf-Gesellschaft was founded, the engineer Wilhelm Schmidt started already developing steam engines. He sold the first patented licence for a hot steam ship engine to the German shipbuilders Blohm & Voss, Hamburg, in 1887. Three years later, business with patented licences for hot steam technology began to flourish. 
In 1895, Wilhelm Schmidt acquired the share majority of Ascherslebener Maschinenfabrik, which was converted into a joint stock company in 1898. There, Schmidt took over a mandate in the supervisory board. The first two hot steam locomotives equipped with the Schmidt’sche superheater system were delivered to the Preußische Eisenbahngesellschaft (German railway company) via Vulkan AG Stettin, and Henschel & Sohn, Kassel. Further companies selling patent rights in superheater technologies were established in England in 1899.

First half of the 20th century 

In the year 1900, the first Schmidt’sche hot steam locomotive was presented at the world exhibition in Paris and received an important prize. In 1902, railway companies in Europe and abroad modified their railroad engines and adopted the Schmidt’sche hot steam technology.

The company Schmidt’sche Heissdampf-Gesellschaft mbH was established in Kassel-Wilhelmshoehe in 1910. Further businesses selling licences for superheater technology in the US, England and France followed. At that time, about 5,000 locomotives with hot steam technology were operated in Germany and abroad. Other technological masterpieces emerged in the next years. The twenty five thousandth locomotive with hot steam technology and the first high-pressure (60 atm) left the factory. A high-pressure piston steam engine with four cylinders was invented.

Introduction of the Schmidt-Hartmann high-pressure boiler took place in 1925; it dominated the German boiler market for more than two decades. A small-tube superheater system for narrow gauge locomotives developed in 1927 established itself all over Europe. The company Henschel & Sohn built in 1928 the first 3-cylinder high-pressure compound locomotive H17206 on basis of Schmidt’sche Heissdampf design. Vereinigte Kesselwerke AG, Düsseldorf, became the most important licensee in 1934 and supplied over 100 hot steam boilers. Main customer was IG Farbenindustrie in Leuna and Bitterfeld, Germany.

In World War II the administration and testing buildings suffered extensive destruction and in 1945 the workshop was completely destroyed. Production had to be stopped. Rebuilding started in 1946, mainly by own employees. In 1950, the manufacturing facility moved from Kassel to Goettingen. In the following years, boilers for different capacities and pressures as well as induced draught systems were built.

Second half of the 20th century 

In 1955, a new superheater with hot steam temperatures over 400 °C was introduced. Henschel & Sohn was the first company applying this technology before it was adopted all over the world. In the same year, the Wiesbadener Westofen GmbH, subsidiary of Didier Werke AG, took over the joint capital from Wilhelm Schmidt's heritages and became new owner.

During research work, the first process gas cooler for ethylene plants was developed in 1959 on basis of the double tube system of hot steam locomotives. In 1960, this system was installed and successfully tested at Rheinische Olefinwerke Wesseling nearby Cologne. In the same year, the last Schmidt’sche hot steam locomotive was taken out of service at the Deutsche Bundesbahn. The destroyed office building in Kassel-Wilhelmshoehe was built up again and the administration and manufacturing site in Kassel-Bettenhausen was established in 1964. From 1970 on, this was the new company location and the site in Goettingen was given up.

The thousandth process gas cooler was produced in 1976; nowadays, this technology is exported to countries all over the world. Also in 1976, the largest steam air station for an oil field of Wintershall AG was developed in the German Emsland. In the following years, further heat recovery systems were invented, for example equipment for nitric acid production and synthesis gas coolers for coal liquefaction. In 1979, Energie- und Verfahrenstechnik GmbH (EVT), a company from Stuttgart active in the field of firing technology, took over the shares in Schmidt’sche Heissdampf-Gesellschaft from Didier AG. The Alsthom Group with headquarters in Paris acquired EVT with all affiliates in 1989.

In 1995, Schmidt’sche Heissdampf-Gesellschaft merged with the company Rekuperator Schack GmbH from Düsseldorf. The name of this traditional company was previously Rekuperator KG Dr.-Ing. Schack & Co. founded by Alfred Schack in 1931. Key products were waste heat systems for energy recovery, recuperators and high-temperature heat exchangers for metallurgical processes. The name of this amalgamation was at first SHG Schack GmbH and three years later ALSTOM Energy Systems SHG GmbH.

21st century 

In the year 2000, the company was named Abb Alstom Power SHG GmbH and then ALSTOM Power Energy Recovery GmbH. This name remained until 2014 when it was changed to Schmidtsche Schack - ARVOS. ember of the Open Industry 4.0 Alliance.

Products 

The company manufactures equipment to transfer process heat at temperatures of up to 1,500 °C and pressures up to 300 bar, such as:
 Process gas coolers for ethylene processes
 Synthesis gas coolers for coal and biomass liquefaction
 Process gas cooling systems for hydrogen, methanol, ammonia and nitric acid production
 High-temperature products, e.g. air preheaters for industrial carbon black production or sludge combustion
 Fired heaters for preheating of various media in many chemical and petrochemical processes .

Books 
 Brachmann, Richard, Mit Heißdampf an die Weltspitze: Porträt eines Unternehmens; ALSTOM Power Energy Recovery GmbH vormals Schmidt'sche Heissdampf-Gesellschaft mbH; 1910 - 2010. George, Habichtswald/Kassel, 2010, 
  Cassel : Selbstverl., 1913

References

External links 
 Arvos Group Hersteller von Elektrotechnik aus Kassel: Firmenprofil und Chronik
 VDE: Transportwege der ARVOS GmbH
 Wilhelm Schmidt

Manufacturing companies of Germany